Sherlock Holmes is a French-British silent film series consisting of eight short films which were produced in 1912 by Éclair.

Production
In 1912, Sir Arthur Conan Doyle sold the film rights of the Sherlock Holmes character to Éclair. French actor Georges Tréville produced and directed the series as well as starred in the title role of Sherlock Holmes. Filmed in England, each film ran approximately 1,700 feet. The series consists of two-reel films. Only loosely based on Doyle's stories, the Franco-British productions were released in America before reaching the rest of the world.

The first three films were released in 1912 and the final five in 1913.

Cast
 Georges Tréville as Sherlock Holmes
 Mr. Moyse as Dr Watson (all but The Speckled Band)

Films
The Speckled Band (1912)
Silver Blaze (1912)
The Beryl Coronet (1912)
The Musgrave Ritual (1913)
The Reigate Squires (1913)
The Stolen Papers (an adaptation of "The Adventure of the Naval Treaty") (1913)
The Mystery of the Boscombe Valley (1913)
The Copper Beeches (1913)

References

Sources

External links

Film series introduced in 1912
1910s crime films
Silent crime films
Sherlock Holmes films based on works by Arthur Conan Doyle
Sherlock Holmes film series